Lerista emmotti, also known commonly as the Noonbah robust slider,  is a species of skink, a lizard in the family Scincidae. The species is endemic to Queensland in Australia.

Etymology
The specific name, emmotti, is in honor of Angus Emmott (born 1962), who is an Australian sheep farmer and naturalist.

Geographic range
Native to central Queensland, the type locality of L. emmotti is Noonbah Station, 140 km south of Longreach.

Habitat
The preferred natural habitats of L. emmotti are savanna and shrubland.

Description
L. emmotti has two digits on each of its four feet.

Behavior
L. emmotti is terrestrial and fossorial.

Reproduction
L. emmotti is oviparous.

References

Further reading
Cogger HG (2014). Reptiles and Amphibians of Australia, Seventh Edition. Clayton, Victoria, Australia: CSIRO Publishing. xxx + 1,033 pp. . 
Ingram GJ, Couper PJ, Donnellan SC (1993). "A new two-toed skink from eastern Australia". Memoirs of the Queensland Museum 33 (1): 341–347. (Lerista emmotti, new species).
Skinner A, Lee MSY, Hutchinson MN (2008). "Rapid and repeated limb loss in a clade of scincid lizards". BMC Evolutionary Biology 8: 310 [nine pages]. (Lerista emmotti, fourth page, Figure 1).
Wilson S, Swan G (2013). A Complete Guide to Reptiles of Australia, Fourth Edition. Sydney: New Holland Publishers. 522 pp. .

Lerista
Reptiles described in 1993
Taxa named by Glen Joseph Ingram
Taxa named by Patrick J. Couper
Taxa named by Steve Donnellan (scientist)